Orly is a commune in the southern suburbs of Paris, Île-de-France.

The name of Orly came from Latin Aureliacum, "the villa of Aurelius".

Orly Airport partially lies on the territory of the commune of Orly, which gave its name to the airport.

Population

Transport
Orly is served by two stations on Paris RER line C: Les Saules and Orly-Ville.

Education
Schools in Orly:
 Preschools (écoles maternelles): Cité Jardins, Jean Moulin, Joliot-Curie, Marcel Cachin, Noyer-Grenot, Paul Eluard, Romain Rolland
 Elementary schools (écoles élémentaires): Cité Jardins, Centre, Jean Moulin, Joliot-Curie, Marcel Cachin A and B, Paul Eluard A and B, Romain Rolland A and B 
 Junior high schools: Collège Dorval and Collège Desnos
 One senior high school/sixth-form college: Lycée des métiers Armand Guillaumin
Lycée Guillaume Apollinaire, a senior high/sixth-form in Thiais; and Lycée Georges Brassens, a senior high/sixth-form in Villeneuve-le-Roi, are nearby.

Personalities
Kery James, rapper
Dry, rapper
Jean Fernand, an impressionist painter

See also

Communes of the Val-de-Marne department

References

External links

Orly city council website 

Communes of Val-de-Marne
Val-de-Marne communes articles needing translation from French Wikipedia